Mathew Helm (born 9 December 1980) is an Australian diver who won the silver medal at the 2004 Summer Olympics in the men's 10-metre platform. He was in first place at the end of the preliminary round and the semi-finals, but was passed by Chinese diver Hu Jia in the finals. In the 2006 Commonwealth Games held in Melbourne, he won the 10-metre platform gold medals in the Individual and Syncro.

Born in Bourke, New South Wales, Helm was an Australian Institute of Sport scholarship holder. Helm is openly gay.

References 

Olympic divers of Australia
Divers at the 2000 Summer Olympics
Divers at the 2004 Summer Olympics
Divers at the 2006 Commonwealth Games
Divers at the 2008 Summer Olympics
Olympic silver medalists for Australia
Olympic bronze medalists for Australia
Commonwealth Games gold medallists for Australia
1980 births
Living people
Sportspeople from Newcastle, New South Wales
Australian Institute of Sport divers
Olympic medalists in diving
Australian LGBT sportspeople
Gay sportsmen
LGBT divers
Australian male divers
Medalists at the 2004 Summer Olympics
World Aquatics Championships medalists in diving
Commonwealth Games medallists in diving
21st-century Australian people
Medallists at the 2006 Commonwealth Games